"It's Every Night Sis" is a song by American YouTube personality and rapper RiceGum, featuring vocals from fellow American YouTube personality Alissa Violet. It was released on June 9, 2017, and is a response to Violet's ex-boyfriend and YouTube personality Jake Paul's diss track "It's Everyday Bro", which was released a little more than a week before the song and targeted Violet.

Background 
From 2015 to 2017, Alissa Violet was in an on-and-off relationship with Jake Paul. In August 2016, Paul and Violet moved into a house with a group of social media personalities associated with Paul, known as "Team 10". Later in 2017, Violet began claiming that Paul was kicking her out of the house and emotionally abusing her. Paul, on the other hand, accused her of cheating on him.

In May 2017, Jake Paul and Team 10 released their diss track "It's Everyday Bro". Alissa Violet collaborated with RiceGum for an answer song that somewhat parodies the diss, titled "It's Every Night Sis".

Charts

Certifications

References 

2017 singles
2017 songs
RiceGum songs
Diss tracks